The Anziku Kingdom, also called the Teke Kingdom, the Tyo Kingdom or Tio Kingdom, was a pre-colonial West Central African state of modern Republic of Congo, Gabon and Democratic Republic of Congo.

Origins
The word Anziku comes from the KiKongo phrase "Anziku Nziku" meaning "to run" referring to inhabitants who leave the interior to protect the border.  The term was applied most famously to the Bateke, which is why the state is sometimes called the kingdom of Teke or Tiyo.  

In the early 17th century, the Anziku population controlled the copper mines around Kongo's northeast border and may have been there specifically as a buffer.  When the Anziku groups consolidated to form their own independent kingdom, Kongo proceeded to take over the mines personally.  This process was complete by the 1620s.  There was, however, fighting between the two states over the region throughout the 17th century.

Geography
The kingdom was centered on the Congo River around the Pool Malebo. It also controlled land directly north of that placing closer to the interior of its better known contemporaries such as Kongo and Loango.  The BaTeke people, who dominated the kingdom, lived on the plateaus of the region from early times. By 1600, Anziku controlled the lower Congo River and extended northwest to the upper Kouilou-Niari basin.

Government
The kingdom was ruled by a king called a makoko.  This led to the state sometimes being labeled "Great Makoko" on European maps.  The capital was called Monsol, located slightly north of Stanley Pool.  According to the account of one of the few visitors, the makoko ruled over 13 vassal kings.

Economy
The Anziku kingdom manufactured and sold fabrics made of leaves, which doubled as currency throughout the region.  Their position closer to the interior also made ivory accessible.  Along with these products, the Anziku sold slaves which they brought to the coast in return for cowries, salt, silk, linen and glass.  The area was also rich in metals particularly copper.  This led to conflict between Anziku and its southern neighbor Kongo.

Customs
The BaTeke and other Anziku groups practiced facial scarification.  The people were also notable for elaborate dress and hairstyles including ornamented braids.  Commoners of both sexes usually went bare chested, but those with money were covered "head to foot" according to European accounts.  Nobles wore robes of silk imported from the coast.

Warfare
The Anzikus may have begun as a military class protecting the BaKongo border.  They were famed as excellent warriors and courageous.  They specialized in archery with poison arrows.  In close combat, they relied on battle axes.  No mention of shields occurs as with most peoples in this region with the exception of Kongo.

Colonization
The kingdom of Anziku survived well into the 19th century.  This is likely in no little part due to its relative isolation from coastal powers.  The French, from whom much of our information about Anziku derives, convinced the kingdom to become a vassal in return for protection.  In 1880, the last independent Anziku king Makoko signed a treaty of vassalage with the French naval officer Pierre Savorgnan de Brazza.  The kingdom continued under French protection producing a line of kings that continues to this very day.

Fiction
At times the Anzikus have been described, probably falsely, as cannibals in the works of European authors.  It was claimed that whole markets were dedicated to the sale of human flesh for consumption.  A notable example is H. P. Lovecraft's The Picture in the House.

References
Volavkova, Zdenka. "Crown and Ritual: The Royal Insignia of Ngoyo". University of Toronto Publishing. 1998
Malte-Brun, Conrad. "Universal Geography: Or, A Description of the World, on a New Plan, According to the Great Natural Divisions of the World". J. Laval, 1829.

See also
History of the Republic of the Congo
Kingdom of Kongo

Countries in precolonial Africa
17th century in Africa